Lepaute may refer to:

Jean-André Lepaute (1720-1789), French clockmaker 
Jean-Baptiste Lepaute (1727-1802), French clockmaker
Nicole-Reine Lepaute or Hortense Lepaute (1723-1788)  French astronomer  
Lepaute (crater)